Cuahutémoc Velasco Vargas (April 28, 1919 – June 13, 1999) was a Mexican professional wrestler and trainer under the name Diablo Velasco. Velasco trained many famous Mexican wrestlers, including Gory Guerrero, Raul Armas, Los Hermanos Crucero, Perro Aguayo, Essa Rios, and Mil Máscaras.  In 2001, Velasco was inducted into the Wrestling Observer Newsletter Hall of Fame in recognition of his career and extensive influence on lucha libre.

Professional wrestling career
Velasco started his wrestling career in 1937 after having trained for two years under the tutelage of Raúl Romero, using the name "Telmo Velazco". Because Velasco did not have the physical size to become a top line wrestler, he was never a main eventer, but because of his skills and tenacity he was a respected mid-card wrestler who could be relied on to put on a good match. In 1942 Velasco decided that his skills would be put to better use training wrestlers than performing in the ring. In 1959 he was made the head trainer of the Arena Coliseo de Guadalajara, one of the biggest wrestling schools in Mexico.

Over the years he trained a long row of future top stars in Lucha Libre instilling in them his work ethic and drive. After some time as the head trainer at Arena Coliseo, his students would gain a reputation as having good prospects in the ring, if Velasco let them graduate they had to have a certain level of skill. Velasco was in the sport not for the money, but because he genuinely loved the sport, a sentiment he managed to pass along to most of his students. Even after an old hip injury forced Velasco to stop getting in the ring with his students he still oversaw and mentored everyone in his gym.

Velasco continued to run his wrestling school until he retired in 1997 at the age of 78, and died in 1999.

Championships and accomplishments
Wrestling Observer Newsletter
Wrestling Observer Newsletter Hall of Fame (Class of 2001)

References

General

1919 births
1999 deaths
20th-century professional wrestlers
Mexican male professional wrestlers
Sportspeople from Guadalajara, Jalisco
Professional wrestlers from Jalisco